Juncus gerardii, commonly known as blackgrass, black needle rush or saltmarsh rush, is a flowering plant in the rush family Juncaceae.

Distribution
Juncus gerardii is mainly a coastal species, occurring at the high tide mark on the Mediterranean, Atlantic, Baltic and Black sea shorelines of Europe and the east coast of North America   Juncus gerardii is one of the many species identified by Eric Hultén as amphi-Atlantic plants, meaning that they have a disjunct  distribution on both sides of the Atlantic, but are absent on the Pacific side of the globe. It also occurs inland in parts of eastern Europe, west and central Asia, particularly on saline soils. In North America it occurs along the shorelines of areas once flooded by the sea, and as a weed along railway lines, for example in Minnesota. In Indiana, it is the only Juncus species found in the Tipton Till Plain, a Till Plain in the Glacial till plains.

References

gerardii
Halophytes
Salt marsh plants
Flora of North America
Plants described in 1809